Vladimír Kováč (born 29 April 1991) is a Slovak football defender.

Career

He joined 1860 Munich in summer 2013 and played the first season for the reserve team. In the last match of the 2014-15 season he made his first appearance for 1860's 2. Bundesliga team. In the 2015-16 season he was sidelined for a long time with a syndesmosis ligament tear. On 1 July 2016, he signed a two-year contract with Wehen Wiesbaden.

On 23 January 2018, Kováč joined FSV Wacker 90 Nordhausen. In October 2019, he was relegated to the club's reserve team alongside 4 other teammates. However, he went to play with the first team again in December 2019.

References

External links
 
  at mfkruzomberok.sk 

1991 births
Living people
Slovak footballers
Slovak expatriate footballers
Association football defenders
MFK Ružomberok players
TSV 1860 Munich players
SV Wehen Wiesbaden players
FSV Wacker 90 Nordhausen players
Slovak Super Liga players
2. Bundesliga players
3. Liga players
Regionalliga players
Sportspeople from Bojnice
Slovak expatriate sportspeople in Germany
Expatriate footballers in Germany